Daoust, D'Aoust, Deault or Dault is a French surname and may refer to:

People 
 Charles Daoust (1825–1868), Canadian politician
 Jean-Baptiste Daoust (1817–1891), MP for Deux-Montagnes, Quebec, Canada
 Mélodie Daoust (born 1992), Canadian hockey player
 Sévère D'Aoust, first colonizer of Sarsfield, Ontario, Canada
 Sylvia Daoust (1902–2004), Canadian sculptor
 Dan Daoust (born 1960), NHL Hockey Player
 Louise Daoust, Founder Designer Lili-les-Bains
 Julien Daoust, Founder of the first theater in Montréal.
 Guillaume D'aoust, Canadian hockey player in France.
 Guillaume D'Aoust, First D'Aoust in Nouvelle-France.

Other 
 Daoust's Corner, former name of Sarsfield, Ontario, Canada
 Daoust Lestage, a Canadian architectural firm